The Forth Road Bridge is a 1965 British documentary film directed by Gordon Lang about the Forth Road Bridge. It was nominated for an Academy Award for Best Documentary Feature. The author Warren Tute wrote the treatment, with Vincent Mulchrone writing the commentary.

References

External links

Watch The Forth Road Bridge at BP Video Library
Watch The Forth Road Bridge at the National Library of Scotland Moving Image Archive

1965 films
1965 documentary films
British documentary films
Documentary films about transport
Films shot in Edinburgh
Films shot in Fife
1960s English-language films
1960s British films